George Mark Paul Stroumboulopoulos (Greek: Γεώργιος Μάρκος Παύλος Στρουμπουλόπουλος; born August 16, 1972) is a Canadian media personality. He is one of Canada's most popular broadcasters and best known as formerly being a VJ for the Canadian music television channel MuchMusic. He was also the host and co-executive producer of the CBC Television talk show George Stroumboulopoulos Tonight (formerly The Hour) from 2005 to 2014. From 2014 to 2016, Stroumboulopoulos worked for Rogers Media, anchoring Hockey Night in Canada and the NHL on Rogers. , he is a radio host on CBC Music. Most recently, he joined Apple Music Radio as host of a Monday to Thursday live show.

Early life
Stroumboulopoulos was born in Malton, Ontario, a neighbourhood in Mississauga, Ontario, to a Greek father from Egypt and a Ukrainian mother. He was raised in Toronto, primarily by his mother and a close-knit extended family. After graduating from Ascension of Our Lord Secondary School, he briefly studied radio broadcasting at Toronto’s Humber College.

Career

Radio
In spring 1993, Stroumboulopoulos worked at rock radio in Kelowna, British Columbia for a few months before getting a job offer at the Toronto radio station Fan 590 AM, working in talk radio. He then moved to CFNY-FM to host various shows including Live in Toronto.

MuchMusic
From 2000 to 2004, Stroumboulopoulos worked at MuchMusic as producer and host of The Punk Show, then host of The NewMusic, MuchLOUD and MuchNews.

The Greatest Canadian
In 2004, Stroumboulopoulos was featured on CBC television's The Greatest Canadian series as the advocate for Tommy Douglas. More than 1.2 million votes were cast over six weeks, as each of 10 advocates made their case for the top 10 nominees. George made a personal and passionate case for Tommy Douglas, Canada's "father of medicare", and Douglas was named the winner of the contest.

The Strombo Show
Stroumboulopoulos has hosted a long-running Sunday night talk radio show, The Strombo Show since 2005, on CBC Radio 2. Originally aired as a talk show on CFRB in Toronto and CJAD in Montreal, the show moved to the Corus network in November 2007 and the format changed to one of mainly music. The Strombo Show broadcast from 102.1 The Edge's Toronto studio and on other radio stations in the Corus Entertainment network, including CFOX-FM in Vancouver, Power 97 in Winnipeg, FM96 in London and Y108 in Hamilton.

The show moved to CBC Radio 2 on November 8, 2009 and continues as a music-oriented freeform radio talk show.

George Stroumboulopoulos Tonight/The Hour

On January 17, 2005, the first episode of The Hour went to air. In the show's seventh season, in 2010, the show's name changed to George Stroumboulopoulos Tonight, and it was shortened from one hour to half an hour. George Stroumboulopoulos Tonight was a hybrid of news and celebrity and covered everything from politics, pop culture, the environment, human rights, entertainment, sports and more. It won eight Gemini Awards. There are a range of guests on the show from world leaders to celebrities and politicians. The show concluded at the end of the 2013-2014 season as Stroumboulopoulos moved to Rogers Communications.

The One: Making a Music Star

In July 2006, Stroumboulopoulos hosted the American reality television talent show, The One: Making a Music Star that aired on ABC in the United States, and CBC Television in Canada. It was advertised as a similar show to American Idol and Rock Star but with the twist that contestants would "live together in a fully functioning music academy", with their actions documented similar to the Big Brother format.

The show was reportedly the most expensive summer series in the history of the ABC network. Its first episode, on July 18, 2006, scored a low audience of 3.08 million viewers, and subsequent episodes had even fewer viewers. The series was cancelled after just two weeks (four episodes) with the final results undecided on July 27, 2006 with no plans for any further episodes.

Stroumboulopoulos on CNN
Stroumboulopoulos’ hour-long talk series for CNN, Stroumboulopoulos, aired during the late spring and the summer of 2013. It was taped before a live audience in Los Angeles, and featured interviews in a format similar to his CBC show. Sometimes, episodes did not air as scheduled. After airing seven episodes from June 14, 2013 to August 16, 2013, CNN did not renew the show.

Hockey Night in Canada and move to Rogers
On March 10, 2014, Rogers Media, which had acquired exclusive national media rights to the National Hockey League, officially announced that Stroumboulopoulos would serve as the main host of Hockey Night in Canada, beginning in October 2014, replacing Ron MacLean. Concurrently, CBC announced the cancellation of George Stroumboulopoulos Tonight after a 10-year run.

Strombo's role on Hockey Night, which was part of an effort to appeal to younger viewers, received mixed reception. Viewers surveyed upon his introduction felt that he was not a "credible" successor to Ron MacLean, In a move which the Toronto Star speculated was meant to help re-gain viewership lost over the first two seasons of the contract (which was also credited to the poor performance of Canadian teams in the 2015-16 season), Sportsnet announced on June 27, 2016 that Stroumboulopoulos had been let go from Rogers, and that Ron MacLean would be reinstated.

Apple Music
Starting on August 18, 2020, George Stroumboulopoulos became the host for his new show called STROMBO on the newly created Apple Music Hits radio station on Apple Music's live radio. The shows airs Monday to Friday every week at 6:00pm (PST).

He recently partnered with Apple Books to launch the book club "Strombo's Lit".

Other Works
Stroumboulopoulos has also hosted a highly regarded documentary series of CBC, "Love, Hate & Propaganda" which was based on examining how propaganda affected and lead to shape crucial events that occur in the 20th century. The documentary included War on Terror, Second World War, and the Cold War.

Over the course of his career, George has interviewed multiple sports stars, entertainment icons, and world leaders.

Charity and public awareness
Stroumboulopoulos and The Hour sponsored the 'One Million Acts of Green' Internet Website challenge, calling on Canadians to register environmental acts they've done. The campaign registered over 1.6 million acts on the website. George and his family have been devoted to this cause also supported by Dr. David Suzuki.

Stroumboulopoulos is a strong advocate of social issues and has been actively part-taking in many global initiatives and involved with numerous charitable initiatives, such as hosting the 'HipHop4Africa' Mandela Children's Fund Canada and CapAids February 2006 Toronto benefit. He has traveled to the Arctic for a special on literacy, youth culture and the loss of Inuit identity.  He has been to Sudan with War Child Canada, and Zambia for a World AIDS Day special documentary. He also supports Make Poverty History. He joined other prominent Canadians in sharing views on global issues in the March 2010 issue of Upstream Journal magazine.

He was executive producer and co-host of Canada for Haiti television with Cheryl Hickey and Ben Mulroney to help the humanitarian crisis in Haiti after a devastating earthquake. He managed to raise over $27 million for the victims of Haitian earthquake.

He also presented at Vancouver's EPIC Expo in May 2011 where he showed support for Fair Trade and the work of Fair Trade Vancouver.

Stroumboulopoulos was selected by the United Nations World Food Programme (WFP) as an official ambassador in March, 2011, thus being named the first Canadian National Ambassador Against Hunger.

Personal life
George Stroumboulopoulos follows a vegan and straight edge lifestyle. He is a fan of the Montreal Canadiens hockey team.

Awards

The Hour won six Gemini Awards.
In 2006 – Viewers Choice Award – Best Host
In 2007 – Best Talk Series – Best Host – Best Production/Design
In 2008 – Best Host
Stroumboulopoulos  was awarded an honorary Doctor of Laws, from the University of Calgary on November 13, 2007.
He was also awarded an honorary degree in Communications from Humber College in June, 2009.
In September 2011, he received the inaugural 'Swarovski Humanitarian Award' at the 5th annual Playback Canadian Film and Television Hall of Fame Gala in Toronto.
On March 6, 2012, the World Economic Forum announced that he had been selected as a Young Global Leader (YGL) for 2012, and was one of three Canadians to receive the indoctrination.
In 2013, George won the Canadian Screen Award for best host in a variety, lifestyle, reality, and performing arts for George Stroumboulopoulos Tonight.
Nobel peace prize nominee for Top 5 under 50 for the humanitarian award sponsored by CBC 2021

He received a Canadian Screen Award nomination for Best Supporting Performance in a Web Program or Series at the 10th Canadian Screen Awards for his role in the comedy web series The Communist's Daughter.

Filmography

2000–2004: MuchMusic host (various shows)
2010: The Strombo Show (radio show)
2010: Canada for Haiti (TV Movie documentary)
2005–2010: The Hour (TV series)
2006: The One: Making a Music Star (talent show)
2010–2015: George Stroumboulopoulos Tonight as host (TV series)
2013: Stroumboulopoulos (CNN TV series)
2014: Hockey Night in Canada
2015: The Plateaus
2015: Being Canadian (documentary)
2018: Design Canada (documentary)
2021: The Communist's Daughter (web series)

References

External links

George Stroumboulopoulos Tonight official website

1972 births
Ambassadors of supra-national bodies
Canadian game show hosts
Canadian people of Greek descent
Canadian people of Ukrainian descent
Canadian people of Egyptian descent
Canadian radio sportscasters
Canadian talk radio hosts
Canadian television sportscasters
Canadian television talk show hosts
CBC Radio hosts
CBC Television people
CNN people
Humber College alumni
Living people
Much (TV channel) personalities
Participants in American reality television series
Participants in Canadian reality television series
People from Mississauga
World Food Programme people
Canadian VJs (media personalities)